Kolonia Dębina  is a settlement in the administrative district of Gmina Wolbórz, within Piotrków County, Łódź Voivodeship, in central Poland.

The settlement has a population of 10.

References

Villages in Piotrków County